KEOS (89.1 FM) is a listener-sponsored, commercial-free, non-profit community radio station serving the Brazos Valley in Bryan, Texas. The station, which has an all-volunteer staff, is affiliated with National Public Radio and Pacifica Radio.

Status 

KEOS 89.1 FM is a Federal Communications Commission licensed non-commercial educational radio station which began broadcasting on March 25, 1995. The owner, Brazos Educational Radio, is a non-profit educational and cultural organization with 501(c)(3) tax-exempt status from the Internal Revenue Service. KEOS continues and is completely locally supported by listeners with pledges, donations, underwriting, and volunteering as well as The Arts Council of Brazos Valley.

History 

On March 25, 1995, KEOS began broadcasting from 508A East 32nd Street in the former Tio Gordo Tortilla production plant. It was appropriately nicknamed the "Tio Gordo Studios" in homage to the building's former occupant.

In 2002, KEOS began broadcasting from 207 East Carson Street in a building formerly occupied by The Early Bird Shop. It was called "The Early Bird Studios."

On December 16, 2006, KEOS began broadcasting from its new home at 202 East Carson Street, formerly the home of KAGC Christian Family Radio.  After selling KAGC, Bob & Judy Bell sold the building with its studios to KEOS.  KEOS now broadcasts from the eponymous "Bob & Judy Bell Studios".

Programming 

KEOS is a Pacifica Radio affiliate, providing programming such as World Cafe and Pacifica Network News in addition to a large quantity of local programming. KEOS offers musical, cultural, and informational programming. It provides a forum for alternative points of view on local, national, and international issues, with particular awareness to women, students, labor, minorities, and other public interest constituencies.

News and information from around the world include World Cafe, and Free Speech Radio News. KEOS features music from folk to rock, from bluegrass to Celtic, American Indian (Native American/First Peoples) to Music from India and the subcontinent, Cajun to Texas roots, blues to Tejano, Trip Hop, to Synth-pop, to EDM, to EBM, to House music.

See also 
List of radio stations in Texas
List of community radio stations in the United States

References

External links 

KEOS Lone Star Jam
Mayoral Candidates debate on KEOS Radio

NPR member stations
EOS
Community radio stations in the United States
Radio stations established in 1995
1995 establishments in Texas